Bănești is a commune in Telenești District, Moldova. It is composed of two villages, Bănești and Băneștii Noi, totalling 1250 households.

References

Communes of Telenești District